is a former Japanese football player. His elder brother Hideki is also a former footballer.

Playing career
Nagai was born in Kagoshima Prefecture on December 23, 1974. After dropped out from Komazawa University, he joined Japan Football League club Fukuoka Blux in 1995. He became a regular player as offensive midfielder and the club won the champions and was promoted to J1 League from 1996. However his opportunity to play decreased for injury from 1996. In October 1998, he moved to Sanfrecce Hiroshima. However he could not play at all in the match. After a year and a half blank, he joined J2 League club Montedio Yamagata in June 2000. He became a regular player as defensive midfielder and played many matches for a long time. In 2007, he moved to J2 club Vegalta Sendai. He played as defensive midfielder with Naoki Chiba. The club won the champions in 2009 and was promoted to J1 from 2010. However his opportunity to play decreased in 2010. In 2011, he moved to Japan Football League club FC Ryukyu. He played with his brother Hideki Nagai at the club. He retired end of 2011 season.

Club statistics

References

External links

1974 births
Living people
Komazawa University alumni
Association football people from Kagoshima Prefecture
Japanese footballers
J1 League players
J2 League players
Japan Football League (1992–1998) players
Japan Football League players
Avispa Fukuoka players
Sanfrecce Hiroshima players
Montedio Yamagata players
Vegalta Sendai players
FC Ryukyu players
Association football midfielders